The PWS-12 was a biplane trainer designed and developed by Podlaska Wytwórnia Samolotów (PWS). It entered production as the PWS-14.

Development
The PWS-12 was a single-engined two-seat training biplane, fit also for aerobatics, designed in 1928 by A. Grzędzielewski and August Bobek-Zdaniewski at the PWS factory. The design shared similar parts, including fuselage and engine, as a high-wing trainer fighter plane PWS-11, developed at the same time. The main difference was the addition of a lower wing. It was powered by a nose-mounted Skoda-built version of the Wright J-5 Whirlwind radial engine. Two prototypes and an airframe for static tests were ordered by the Aviation Department of the War Ministry in February 1928 (along with the PWS-11 prototypes). The first prototype was flown by Franciszek Rutkowski in November 1929. It was later improved - among others, a Townend ring replaced NACA cowling, and it was fitted with N-shaped struts between wings instead of perpendicular struts. The second improved prototype was flown on 18 November 1930, and designated PWS-12bis. Testing was successful and a production order for 20 aircraft was placed by the Polish Air Force.

In a meantime, the factory developed improved model PWS-14, featuring a change from wooden to a steel-tube fuselage, strengthened wings and other improvements, like a door in first cockpit's side. The War Ministry ordered a production of one PWS-14 and a similar modification of the series being in production. It caused some financial problems for the factory, since a production of PWS-12s had already started. As a result, the factory delivered in 1932 a series of 20 PWS-14, marked officially as PWS-12 (military numbers 57.1 - 57.20). A further development of PWS-14 was PWS-16, and then PWS-26.

Operational service

The PWS-14s, officially marked as PWS-12s, were used by the Polish Air Force from 1933 in the Officer Training Centre in Dęblin and a Flying School in Grudziądz. Most were next replaced by the PWS-16 and PWS-26, some remained in use until World War II in 1939.

The second prototype PWS-12bis (factory no. 358) was modified in 1931 to a role of an aerobatics aircraft. Among others, fuselage sides were made flat and a rudder shape was changed. It received markings SP-AKE and was flown mainly by Lt. J. Orłowski. In March 1931 it was used in a trip to Estonia, and in April 1933 - to Romania, Bulgaria, Yugoslavia, Austria and Czechoslovakia. Then, both prototypes were used for several years as utility aircraft in Aviation Technical Research Institute (ITBL). They were later stored in Dęblin.

Variants
PWS-12
Prototype of wooden construction.
PWS-12bis
Second improved prototype
PWS-14
Improved model of mixed construction (aircraft delivered to the Air Force were marked as PWS-12)

Specifications (PWS-14)

See also

References

 

PWS aircraft
1920s Polish military trainer aircraft
Single-engined tractor aircraft
Biplanes
Aircraft first flown in 1929